American singer and songwriter Thomas Rhett has released six studio albums, one extended play and 28 singles, including five as a featured artist. USA Today hailed him as the “Prince of Country Music” for attaining 18 No. 1 hits in just 9 years. Billboard ranked him as the 12th Top Country Artist of the 2010s decade and the 95th Top Artist of the Decade overall. Rhett has scored 2 No. 1 albums on Billboard 200. According to Recording Industry Association of America, Rhett has sold 40 million singles and 4.5 million certified albums in the United States. 

His debut album, It Goes Like This, debuted in the top 10 of the Billboard 200 in 2013 and produced three number one singles on the Billboard Country Airplay chart. Rhett released his second album Tangled Up in 2015, which peaked at number six on the Billboard 200. Four of the album's five singles reached number one on the country charts, while the second single, "Die a Happy Man" became his first crossover success and highest-charting single on the Billboard Hot 100. His third album, Life Changes, was released in 2017 and includes the chart-topping single "Craving You". Twelve of Rhett's singles have received at least a Gold certification from the Recording Industry Association of America (RIAA), with seven going Platinum. Rhett has also written songs for other country artists, and made history in 2013 when half of the top 10 singles on the Country Airplay chart were written by Rhett or his father, Rhett Akins, including the singer's own chart-topping hit, "It Goes Like This".

Studio albums

Extended plays

Singles

As lead artist

As featured artist

Other songs

Promotional singles

Other charted songs

Other appearances

Music videos

Notes

References

Discographies of American artists
Country music discographies